Tetradactylus seps, commonly known as the short-legged seps or five-toed whip lizard, is a species of lizard in the family Gerrhosauridae.
The species is found in South Africa.

References

Tetradactylus
Reptiles described in 1758
Fauna of South Africa
Taxa named by Carl Linnaeus